John Julius Green (June 25, 1899 – death date unknown) was an American Negro league outfielder in the 1920s.

A native of Galveston, Texas, Green played for the Memphis Red Sox in 1929. In 72 recorded games that season, he posted 61 hits with two home runs and 19 RBI in 290 plate appearances.

References

External links
 and Seamheads

1899 births
Year of death missing
Place of death missing
Memphis Red Sox players
Baseball outfielders
Baseball players from Texas
Sportspeople from Galveston, Texas